Pectis tenuicaulis, the island cinchweed, is a summer blooming annual plant in the genus Pectis.

tenuicaulis
Flora of North America